"Moi aimer toi" is a song by French singer Vianney. It was released as a single on March 13, 2017, and is the second single from the Vianney album.

Charts

Weekly charts

Yearly charts

References 
 

2017 songs
Vianney (singer) songs
2017 singles